Kani is a rural locality (a selo) in Kulinsky District, Republic of Dagestan, Russia. The population was 292 as of 2010. There are 4 streets.

Geography 
Kani is located 13 km northwest of Vachi (the district's administrative centre) by road. Khoykhi and Vikhli are the nearest rural localities.

Nationalities 
Laks live there.

References 

Rural localities in Kulinsky District